Petr Martin (born 21 June  1989 in Prague) is a professional squash player who represented Czech Republic. He reached a career-high world ranking of World No. 168 in May 2010.

References

External links 
 
 

Czech male squash players
Living people
1989 births
Sportspeople from Prague